Mimene toxopei is a butterfly of the family Hesperiidae. It is found in Papua on New Guinea.

The length of the forewings is 16–17 mm.

External links
Notes on some skippers of the Taractrocera-group (Lepidoptera: Hesperiidae: Hesperiinae) from New Guinea

Hesperiinae
Butterflies described in 2008